Georgetown Scott County Airport , also known as Marshall Field, is a public use airport located six nautical miles (11 km) east of the central business district of Georgetown, a city in Scott County, Kentucky, United States. This airport is owned by the Georgetown Scott County Airport Corp. It is also known as Georgetown-Scott County Regional Airport.

Facilities and aircraft
It has one asphalt paved runway designated 3/21 which measures 5,498 by 100 feet (1,676 x 30 m).

For the 12-month period ending May 9, 2007, the airport had 24,850 aircraft operations, an average of 68 per day: 92% general aviation, 6% air taxi and 2% military. At that time there were 80 aircraft based at this airport: 71% single-engine, 16% multi-engine, 3% jet and 10% helicopter.

References

External links
 Aerial photo as of 18 April 1993 from USGS The National Map
 
 

Airports in Kentucky
Buildings and structures in Scott County, Kentucky
Transportation in Scott County, Kentucky